This is a list of notable, active and retired, international weightlifter of the Republic of Turkey.

Active

Women

48 kg
Nurdan Karagöz
Şaziye Okur
Sibel Özkan
Nurcan Taylan

53 kg
Ayşegül Çoban

58 kg
Aylin Daşdelen

63 kg

69 kg
Sibel Şimşek

75 kg
Şule Şahbaz

+75 kg
Ümmühan Uçar

Men

56 kg
Sedat Artuç
Gökhan Kılıç
Halil Mutlu

62 kg
Hurşit Atak
Erol Bilgin
Bünyamin Sezer

69 kg
Mete Binay
Daniyar Ismayilov

77 kg
Reyhan Arabacıoğlu
Taner Sağır
Semih Yağcı

85 kg
İzzet İnce

94 kg
Hakan Yılmaz

105 kg
Bünyamin Sudaş

Retired

Women

Men

60 kg
 Cemal Erçman
Naim Süleymanoğlu

 
Weightlifters
Turkey